Alfonso Gerald Frazer (born January 4, 1948) is a former Panamanian boxer who held the Lineal and WBA Light welterweight titles. He competed in the men's featherweight event at the 1964 Summer Olympics.

1964 Olympic results
Below is the record of Alfonso Gerald Frazer, a Panamanian featherweight boxer who competed at the 1964 Tokyo Olympics:
 
 Round of 32: lost to Heinz Schulz (German Unified Team) referee stopped contest

Professional career
Known as "Peppermint," Frazer began his professional career in 1965 and won the Lineal and World Boxing Association light welterweight titles by defeating Nicolino Locche by unanimous decision in 1972. He lost the belt in his first defense by knockout to Antonio Cervantes later that year, and also lost a rematch to Cervantes by TKO in 1973.He fought future champion Aaron Pryor in 1979 and was TKO'd in the fifth round. He never challenged for a major title again, and retired in 1981.

Professional boxing record

See also
List of light welterweight boxing champions
List of WBA world champions

References

External links
 
Alfonso "Peppermint" Frazer - CBZ Profile

1948 births
Living people
Sportspeople from Panama City
Welterweight boxers
Panamanian male boxers
Olympic boxers of Panama
Boxers at the 1964 Summer Olympics